Umrer College of Engineering (UCOE) is a four-year engineering college located near Nagpur, India. It is affiliated to Nagpur University and  accredited by the All India Council for Technical Education.

History 
The college was founded by the BCYR Committee headed by Shri Bhausaheb Mulak ex-Minister (government of Maharashtra), ex-Mayor (NMC, Nagpur) in 1999.

Departments  
 Computer Engineering
 Electronics Engineering
 Mechanical Engineering
 Master of Business Administration
 Basic Science and Humanities

External links
UCOE

Engineering colleges in Maharashtra
Nagpur district
Educational institutions established in 1999
1999 establishments in Maharashtra